Odd Harald Hovland (born 29 September 1962) is a Norwegian politician.

He was elected representative to the Storting from the constituency of Hordaland for the period 2021–2025, for the Labour Party.

References

1962 births
Living people
Labour Party (Norway) politicians
Hordaland politicians
Members of the Storting